Yaganti Temple or Sri Yaganti Uma Maheswara Temple is a temple of Shiva in Nandyal district in the India state of Andhra Pradesh. It was built according to Vaishnavaite traditions.

History 
This temple was constructed by King Harihara Bukka Raya of the Sangama Dynasty of the Vijayanagara Empire in the 15th century. It was built according to Vaishnavaite traditions.

One story of the site's origin is as follows: The sage Agastya wanted to build a temple for Lord Venkateswara on this site. However, the statue that was made could not be installed as the toe nail of the idol got broken. The sage was upset over this and performed a penance for Shiva. When Shiva appeared, he said the place suits Shiva better as it resembles Kailash. Agastya then requested Shiva to give the devotees a Parvathi Goddess as Lord Uma Maheswara in a single stone, which Shiva obliged.

A second story is as follows: Chitteppa, a devotee of Shiva, was worshiping Shiva and Shiva appeared to him as a tiger. Chitteppa understood that it was Lord Shiva in tiger form, and shouted Neganti Shivanu ne kanti (meaning: I saw Shiva I saw), and danced with joy.  There is a cave called Chitteppa nearby. Sri Yaganti Uma Maheswara Temple is one of the few temples patronized by one of the great dynasties of India. Every year Maha Shivaratri is celebrated and a large number of devotees from all over Andhra Pradesh visit. Shiva, Parvati and Nandi are the main deities in this temple. This temple is 14 km away from Banaganipalli in kurnool dt. The saint lord Veerabrahmendra swami stayed here for some time and wrote Kalagnanam.

Architecture

Pushkarini 
A feature of this temple is its Pushkarini, a small pond of water on the temple premises. Water flows into this Pushkarini from the bottom of hill through the mouth of a Nandi (bull). The water is fresh and sweet, as it comes from the hills. No one knows how the water reaches the pond all year round and this temple architecture in terms of its sculpture shows the skills of ancient Viswakarma Sthapathis. Devotees find that a holy bath in Pushkarini is highly beneficial. After taking a bath in Pushkarini, they pay tributes to Lord Shiva.
 The sage Agasthya bathed in Pushkarini and worshipped Shiva.

Caves present in and around yaganti temple are:

Agastya Cave 
This is the cave where Agastya performed his penance for Shiva. One can enter the cave by climbing 120 steep steps. An idol to Devi is installed and may be worshipped here.

Venkateswara Cave 
The damaged idol of Lord Venkateswara is present in this cave. Compared to Agastya cave it is easy to climb though the steps are steep. According to the story this idol was present in this cave before the Tirumala Venkateswara Temple was constructed. But as the idol is damaged near the foot, it could not be worshipped. Sri Sri Potuluri Veera Brahmendra Swami tells us in his Kala Gynanam that this place can stand as an alternative to Tirupati.

Veera Brahmam Cave 
This is the cave where saint Sree Potuluri Veera Brahmendra swamy wrote some of his Kala Gnaanam (prophecy). The height of the cave is less and one needs to bend half over to enter it.

Popular beliefs

Growing Nandi 

The devotees believe that the Nandi idol in front of the temple is continuously increasing its size. The locals say that the idol was initially much smaller than its present size. They say that certain experimentation was carried out on this idol and it was said that the type of rock out of which the idol is carved has a growing or enlarging nature associated with it.

It is said that people used to do Pradakshinas (rounds) around it in the past. The temple staff has already removed one pillar as the size of the Nandi has increased.
According to Potuluri Veera Brahmendra swamy, the Basavanna (stone nandi) of Yaganti will come alive and shout when Kali Yuga ends.

Absence of Crows  
Legend has it that while the Sage Agastya was performing his penance, crows disturbed him and he cursed that the crows cannot enter the place. As the crow is the Vahana for Lord Shani, it is believed that Shani cannot enter this place.

Transportation 
Yaganti is located in the Nandyal District in the state of Andhra Pradesh, India, approximately 100 km from the city of Kurnool. The temple is 14 km west of Banaganapalle (Mandal headquarters) on the Banaganapalle-Peapully road.we can reach the temple even from the Historic site Belum caves in 1.5hrs and measures a distance of 45 km.

Gallery

References 

Hindu temples in Kurnool district
Archaeological sites in Andhra Pradesh
Shiva temples in Andhra Pradesh